The 2016 Canadian Tire National Skating Championships were held January 18–24, 2016 in Halifax, Nova Scotia. Organized by Skate Canada and sponsored by Canadian Tire, the event determined the national champions of Canada. Medals were awarded in the disciplines of men's singles, women's singles, pair skating, and ice dancing on the senior, junior, and novice levels. Although the official International Skating Union terminology for female skaters in the singles category is ladies, Skate Canada uses women officially. The results of this competition were among the selection criteria for the 2016 World Championships, 2016 Four Continents Championships, and the 2016 World Junior Championships.

Halifax was named as the host in May 2015. Competitors qualified at the Skate Canada Challenge, held in December 2015, or earned a bye.

Medal summary

Senior

Junior

Novice

Senior results

Men

Women

Pairs

Ice dancing

Junior results

Men

Women

Pairs

Ice dancing

Novice results

Men

Women

Pairs

Ice dancing

International team selections

World Championships
The team for the 2016 World Championships was announced on January 24, 2016. On March 11, 2016, it was announced that Julianne Séguin / Charlie Bilodeau and Liam Firus withdrew and were to be replaced by Kirsten Moore-Towers / Michael Marinaro and Nam Nguyen.

Four Continents Championships
The team for the 2016 Four Continents Championships was announced on January 24, 2016.

World Junior Championships
The team for the 2016 World Junior Championships was announced on January 24, 2016.

References

Canadian Figure Skating Championships
Figure skating
Canadian Figure Skating Championships
Sports competitions in Halifax, Nova Scotia
Canadian Figure Skating Championships